L'Estampe Moderne appeared in 1897-1899 as a series of 24 monthly fascicles, each of 4 original lithographs, priced at 3 francs 50 centimes and printed by Imprimerie Champenois of Paris. Many accomplished European Art Nouveau painters contributed works to this publication. The richly lithographed prints had as a blindstamp (or embossed device), the imprint of a young woman's profile in the lower right corner. The prints are much sought after in the current art world.

In the 1890s various fascicles of original prints were issued by French publishers. L’épreuve was edited by Maurice Dumont  and appeared monthly between December 1894 and December 1895 - L’Estampe originale was a quarterly edited by André Marty between 1893 and 1895 - the original L’estampe moderne was published in five folios between November 1895 and March 1896 edited by Loÿs Delteil - the second L’Estampe Moderne was published monthly between May 1897 and April 1899.

The publication was edited by Charles Masson and H. Piazza. Each issue came in a paper cover bearing an original lithograph by Alphonse Mucha. The publisher offered two extra lithographs a year, the "planches de prime", as an incentive to prospective subscribers. The aim was to promote the art of printmaking by commissioning images from noted Art Nouveau artists, such as Alphonse Mucha, Louis Rhead, Marcel-Lenoir, Henri Boutet, Henri Fantin-Latour, Edward Burne-Jones and Théophile Steinlen.

Gallery

References

1897 establishments in France
1899 disestablishments in France
L'Estampe Moderne
Defunct magazines published in France
French art publications
French-language magazines
Magazines established in 1897
Magazines disestablished in 1899
Magazines published in Paris
Monthly magazines published in France